Factory Girl (Fataat El Masnaa) is an Egyptian romantic drama film directed by Mohamed Khan. The film premiered at the Dubai International Film Festival in December 2013. It was selected as the Egyptian entry for the Best Foreign Language Film at the 87th Academy Awards, but was not nominated.

Plot
21-year-old Hiyam (Yasmin Raeis) is an impoverished worker in a Cairo textile factory. When Salah (Hany Adel), the factory's new supervisor, becomes attracted to her and a pregnancy comes into play, Hiyam sees an opportunity to take control of her own fate and to move up in the world. But there is a very high price to pay.

Production
The film was funded by DIFF's Enjaaz fund, the Abu Dhabi Film Festival's SANAD fund, the Global Film Initiative, Women in Film Foundation, German's GIZ institution and the Egyptian Ministry of Culture's Filmmaking Fund.
Cinematography was done by the Egyptian Mahmoud Lotfi, who previously gained notoriety for his work on Coming Forth by Day.

Cast
Yasmin Raeis as Hiyam
Hany Adel as Salah
Salwa Khattab as Hiyam's Mother
Salwa Mohammad Ali as Hiyam's aunt Samra

See also
 List of submissions to the 87th Academy Awards for Best Foreign Language Film
 List of Egyptian submissions for the Academy Award for Best Foreign Language Film

References

External links
 

2013 films
2013 romantic drama films
2010s Arabic-language films
Egyptian romantic drama films